The title of Marquess of Montagu was created in 1470 for John Neville, 1st Earl of Northumberland, younger brother of Warwick the Kingmaker. Montagu was killed at the Battle of Barnet in 1471, and was attainted and the peerage forfeit.

Marquesses of Montagu (1470)
Other titles: Baron Montagu (1461)
John Neville, 1st Marquess of Montagu (1431–1471), a leader in the Wars of the Roses, was created Marquess by Edward IV, King of England in return for surrendering his Earldom back to the Percy Earls of Northumberland

Marquess
Forfeited marquessates in the Peerage of England
Noble titles created in 1470